Boronia odorata is a plant in the citrus family Rutaceae and is endemic to the central highlands of Queensland, Australia. It is an erect shrub with many branches, mostly simple leaves and pink to white, four-petalled flowers.

Description
Mature plants have simple leaves but the leaves of young plants are trifoliate. The eight stamens alternate in length, size and shape.

Taxonomy and naming
Boronia odorata was first formally described in 1999 by Marco F. Duretto and the description was published in the journal Austrobaileya. The specific epithet (odorata) is a Latin word meaning "having a smell" or "fragrant" referring to the tar or coffee odour of the leaves when crushed.

Distribution and habitat
This boronia grows in woodland on sandstone in the central highlands of Queensland in an area bounded by Springsure, Theodore, Surat, Mitchell and Tambo.

Conservation
Boronia odorata is classed as "least concern" under the Queensland Government Nature Conservation Act 1992.

References 

odorata
Flora of Queensland
Plants described in 1999
Taxa named by Marco Duretto